La Vista is a city in Sarpy County, Nebraska, United States. The population was 15,758 at the 2010 census. The city was incorporated on February 23, 1960.

La Vista is a suburb of Omaha. It is bordered by the cities of Omaha and Ralston on the north, Papillion on the south, Bellevue on the east, and Interstate 80 to the west. La Vista is Sarpy County's third largest city, after Bellevue and Papillion, the county seat.

History
La Vista was established in 1959 by a developer who planned to build 335 homes on La Vista’s land. Priced at a modest $9,999 each, it soon became known as "House of Nines." At the time, the assessed valuation was just over $1,000,000. The first families began moving into their homes in January 1960. La Vista (meaning "the view") was selected as its name by these "early settlers" because of the beautiful scenic view of the Big Papio Creek basin southeast of the development.

Geography
La Vista is located at  (41.184344, -96.039441).

Demographics

2010 census
At the 2010 census there were 15,758 people, 6,419 households, and 4,058 families living in the city. The racial makeup of the city was 86.9% White, 3.9% African American, 0.4% Native American, 3.2% Asian, 0.1% Pacific Islander, 2.6% from other races, and 2.8% from two or more races. Hispanic or Latino of any race were 6.5%.

Of the 6,419 households 34.5% had children under the age of 18 living with them, 45.7% were married couples living together, 12.9% had a female householder with no husband present, 4.6% had a male householder with no wife present, and 36.8% were non-families. 28.7% of households were one person and 5.1% were one person aged 65 or older. The average household size was 2.45 and the average family size was 3.06.

The median age was 32.1 years. 25.9% of residents were under the age of 18; 10.3% were between the ages of 18 and 24; 31.7% were from 25 to 44; 24.6% were from 45 to 64; and 7.5% were 65 or older. The gender makeup of the city was 48.3% male and 51.7% female.

2000 census
At the 2000 census, there were 11,699 people, 4,404 households, and 3,131 families living in the city. The population density was 4,114.8 people per square mile (1,590.5/km). There were 4,511 housing units at an average density of 1,586.6/sq mi (613.3/km). The racial makeup of the city was 90.45% White, 2.94% African American, 0.39% Native American, 2.35% Asian, 0.10% Pacific Islander, 1.62% from other races, and 2.14% from two or more races. Hispanic or Latino of any race were 4.15% of the population.

Of the 4,404 households 40.0% had children under the age of 18 living with them, 52.5% were married couples living together, 14.9% had a female householder with no husband present, and 28.9% were non-families. 21.4% of households were one person and 3.3% were one person aged 65 or older. The average household size was 2.66 and the average family size was 3.13.

The age distribution was 29.8% under the age of 18, 10.4% from 18 to 24, 36.4% from 25 to 44, 18.9% from 45 to 64, and 4.5% 65 or older. The median age was 30 years. For every 100 females, there were 94.6 males. For every 100 females age 18 and over, there were 89.6 males.

The median household income was $47,280, and the median family income  was $52,819. Males had a median income of $34,732 versus $25,076 for females. The per capita income for the city was $19,612. About 4.4% of families and 5.7% of the population were below the poverty line, including 7.9% of those under age 18 and 3.1% of those age 65 or over.

Schools
Almost all of La Vista falls within the Papillion-La Vista Public School system, while a small section is in Millard Public Schools.

Elementary schools
(Grades K-6)
 Portal Elementary, 9920 Brentwood Drive
 Parkview Heights Elementary, 7609 South 89th Street
 La Vista West Elementary, 7821 Terry Drive
 G. Stanley Hall Elementary, 7600 South 72nd Street

Middle school
Grades 7-8
La Vista Junior High is located at 7900 Edgewood Blvd

High schools
Grades 9-12
 Papillion-La Vista Senior High School

References

External links

 La Vista city info website

Cities in Sarpy County, Nebraska
Cities in Nebraska
Populated places established in 1960